Jake and the Kid is a Canadian dramatic television series which aired on CBC Television in 1961.

Premise
Adaptations of W. O. Mitchell's Jake and the Kid stories were broadcast on CBC Radio between 1949 and 1954. CBC Television produced this 13-part series featuring Jake Trumper (Murray Westgate), the Kid (Rex Hagon) and Ma (Frances Tobias), MacTaggart (Robert Christie), Repeat Golightly (Eric House) and Sam Gatenby (Alex McKee) in the community of Crocus, Saskatchewan.

A new version of the series, Jake and the Kid, aired in the 1990s.

Scheduling
This half-hour series was broadcast on Tuesdays at 8:30 p.m. (Eastern) from 4 July to 19 September 1961.

An unsuccessful attempt by the National Film Board of Canada to produce a full season of Jake and the Kid series for the CBC resulted in only one production, "Political Dynamite" which was broadcast as a CBC Television special on 23 June 1963. Here, John Drainie portrayed Jake as he did for the CBC Radio series, while Tony Haig was cast as the Kid.

References

External links
 
 
 

1961 Canadian television series debuts
1963 Canadian television series endings
CBC Television original programming
Fictional duos
Television duos
Television shows filmed in Edmonton
Television shows set in Saskatchewan